General Carlos Ibáñez del Campo (3 November 1877 – 28 April 1960) was a Chilean Army officer and political figure. He served as President twice, first between 1927 and 1931, and then from 1952 to 1958, serving for 10 years in office.

The coups of 1924 and 1925 
The presidency of Arturo Alessandri saw a rise in popular discontent over an inefficient government. In 1924, the Chilean armed forces, led by General Luis Altamirano, began the saber-rattling (ruido de sables), a protest where soldiers banged their sabers against the floor of the Congress. Amid threats from the armed forces, Alessandri decided he could no longer govern and submitted his resignation. Although this resignation was not approved by Congress, Alessandri left the country and Altamirano established a military junta.

However, another faction of the armed forces, led by Colonel Marmaduke Grove and Lieutenant Colonel Ibáñez, decided the junta's reforms did not go far enough in ending the government's inefficiency. They led another coup, deposed Altamirano, and established a new junta with Emilio Bello Codesido as head. Ibáñez and Grove, the powers behind the scene, agreed to ask Alessandri to return and complete his term.

Minister of War and Home Affairs
Alessandri returned in 1925 and drafted a new constitution which was designed to decrease the powers of the legislature, thereby making government more effective. Ibáñez was named Minister of War and later Home Affairs Minister. However, Alessandri decided Ibáñez was becoming too ambitious, and many ridiculed Alessandri as a pawn of Ibáñez. In response, Alessandri resigned once more and went into exile. Ibáñez announced his candidacy in the upcoming presidential elections, but the three main Chilean political parties (Conservative, Liberal, Radical) pressured him to desist. The three parties then presented a consensus choice, Emiliano Figueroa Larraín, to be the sole presidential candidate, in order to avoid political campaigning in the volatile political atmosphere.
Nevertheless, Ibáñez's closest adviser, leftist José Santos Salas, later declared his presidential candidacy, and many suspected it was with Ibáñez's backing.

Figueroa triumphed with 71% of the vote, but kept Ibáñez as Home Affairs Minister. Ibáñez was able to control the weak Figueroa who decided to resign in 1927 rather than be Ibáñez's puppet. Because he was Home Affairs Minister, under the Chilean constitution, Ibáñez became Vice President and announced elections for 22 May that year. In the presidential elections, the traditional political parties decided not to participate. Ibáñez's only opponent was the communist Elías Lafertte, who was exiled in the Juan Fernández Archipelago throughout the electoral campaign. Ibáñez won the election with 98% of the vote.

First presidency 

Ibáñez began to exercise dictatorial powers, using rule by decree (decretos con fuerza de ley), suspending parliamentary elections, instead naming politicians to the Senate and Chamber of Deputies himself, etc. Political opponents were arrested and exiled, including his former ally Marmaduke Grove. His popularity, however,  was helped by massive loans by American banks, which helped to promote a high rate of growth in the country. He constructed massive public works, and increased public spending. He also created the Carabineros de Chile (police force) by unifying the previously disorganized police forces. Another significant achievement of Ibáñez's first administration was the signing of the 1929 Treaty of Lima, in which Chile agreed to return the Tacna Province to Peru, which had been seized during the War of the Pacific.

His popularity lasted until after the 1929 collapse of Wall Street. At that point all loans were halted and called. Without the influx of foreign currency, Chile was heavily affected by the Great Depression. Ibáñez's large public spending did nothing to alleviate the situation, and his opponents, primarily the exiled Grove and Alessandri, began to plan a comeback. After a great wave of public unrest, Ibáñez left the country for exile, on 26 July 1931, after delegating his office to the president of the senate, Pedro Opazo, who in turn resigned in favor of the interior minister, Juan Esteban Montero.

Between presidencies 
Chile did not reach political stability until the 1932 reelection of Arturo Alessandri, whose economic policies managed to alleviate the depression. He ran for president again in the 1942 election, but lost to Juan Antonio Rios.

Return to the Presidency 

In the 1952 presidential elections, the center-right Agrarian Labor Party (Partido Agrario Laborista) declared Ibáñez a presidential candidate. Ibáñez also garnered the support of the left-wing Popular Socialist Party and some feminist political unions — the feminist María de la Cruz was his campaign manager, but she then refused a ministerial office. Ibáñez promised to "sweep" out political corruption and bad government with his "broom" and was nicknamed the "General of Hope". He criticized traditional political parties but was vague in his proposals and had no clear position in the political spectrum. He won the election with 47%.

The Bolivian National Revolution of 1952 influenced the followers of Ibáñez who saw it as a model of the national-populism they sought to implement in Chile.

His second term was a very modest success. By that time he was already old and ailing, and he left government mostly to his cabinet. His major problems during his presidency were those concerned with the economy. He had no plan to control inflation – one of the most pressing economic problems at the time in Chile – and as a result it skyrocketed to 71% in 1954 and 83% in 1955. Helped by the Klein-Sacks mission, Ibáñez managed to reduce it to 33% when he left the presidency. During his term, public transport costs rose by 50% and economic growth fell to 2.5%

Now much more of a centrist politically, Ibáñez won the support of many left-wingers by repealing the Law for the Defense of Democracy, which banned the Communist Party. He did also take a softer approach on crime than in his first presidency. For example, he commuted the death sentence for The Jackal of Pupunahue to life imprisonment.

Some Chileans continued to support an Ibáñez dictatorship. These ibañistas, most of whom were retired army officers, created the "Línea Recta" (Straight Line) group to establish a new dictatorship. Ibáñez met with these conspirators, but ultimately his typical lack of trust ended the plans for a self-coup. A scandal rocked the Ibáñez administration when the press revealed Ibáñez's meetings with these conspirators.

Retirement and legacy 
Ibáñez was succeeded by Jorge Alessandri Rodriguez, the son of his arch-enemy Arturo Alessandri. He abandoned politics and died in Santiago in 1960. As a result of Ibañez's nebulous  and vacillating political ideology, he left no intellectual legacy to Chilean politics.

The Región Aysén del General Carlos Ibáñez del Campo is named after him, in honor of his attempts to integrate the isolated regions of Aysén and Magallanes into Chile. The General Ibáñez Airport in Punta Arenas is also named after him.

See also
Government Junta of Chile (1924)
Government Junta of Chile (1925)
Presidential Republic Era

References

Sources
San Francisco, Alejandro, and Ángel Soto, eds. Camino a La Moneda. Santiago: Centro De Estudios Bicentenario, 2005.
Collier, Simon, and William F. Sater. A History of Chile, 1808-2002. 2nd ed. Cambridge UP, 2002.
Braun, Juan, and Matías Braun, Ignacio Briones, José Díaz, Rolf Lüders, Gert Wagner. Economía chilena 1810-1995: Estadísticas históricas. Santiago: Instituto de Economía de la Pontificia Universidad Católica de Chile, 2000.

External links
 Official Biography 
 Complete Biography 
 Documents related to Ibáñez from the Spanish Wikisource 
 
 

1877 births
1960 deaths
Anti-Marxism
Anti-Masonry
Antisemitism in Chile
People from Linares
Presidents of Chile
Heads of state of Chile
Chilean Ministers of the Interior
Chilean Ministers of Defense
Chilean Army generals
Recipients of the Order of the Liberator General San Martin
Chilean people of Irish descent
Chilean anti-communists
Chilean people of Spanish descent
Grand Crosses Special Class of the Order of Merit of the Federal Republic of Germany
Recipients of the Order of the White Eagle (Poland)
Honorary Knights Grand Cross of the Order of the British Empire